Lingga is a state constituency in Sarawak, Malaysia, that has been represented in the Sarawak State Legislative Assembly since 1979.

The state constituency was created in the 1977 redistribution and is mandated to return a single member to the Sarawak State Legislative Assembly under the first past the post voting system.

History
It was abolished in 1991 after it was redistributed. It was re-created in 2005.

2006–2016: The constituency contains the polling districts of Lingga, Meludam, Seduku, Stumbin, Ladong, Lamanak.

2016–present: The constituency contains the polling districts of Lingga, Meludam, Seduku, Stumbin, Ladong, Lamanak.

Representation history

Election results

References

Sarawak state constituencies